Paul Brizzel (born 3 October 1976) is an Irish sprinter. He competed in the men's 100 metres at the 2000 Summer Olympics.

References

External links
 

1976 births
Living people
Athletes (track and field) at the 2000 Summer Olympics
Athletes (track and field) at the 2004 Summer Olympics
Irish male sprinters
Olympic athletes of Ireland
Place of birth missing (living people)